Partibrejkers III is the third studio album by the Serbian garage rock/punk rock band Partibrejkers, released by Jugodisk in 1989.

Track listing 
All tracks written by Zoran Kostić and Nebojša Antonijević.

Personnel 
Partibrejkers
 Nebojša Antonijević "Anton" — guitar
 Zoran Kostić "Cane" — vocals
 Igor Borojević — drums, recorded by
 Dime Todorov "Mune" — bass

Additional personnel
 Milan Ćirić — producer
 Vlada Negovanović — mixed by
 Petar Miladinović "Pera Joey" — harmonica
 Srđan Marković — artwork by [cover]
 Goran Nikolašević — photography

References

External links
 Partibrejkers III at Discogs

1989 albums
Partibrejkers albums
Jugodisk albums